Bonópolis is a municipality in north Goiás state, Brazil. It is largely rural with a substantial cattle herd.

Location
Highway connections from Goiânia:  GO-080 / Nerópolis / BR-153 / Jaraguá / GO-080 / Goianésia / Barro Alto / GO-342 / Uruaçu / Campinorte / GO-329 / GO-080 / Estrela do Norte / GO-241/ Mutunópolis / GO-241 / (70 km unpaved).

Bonópolis is surrounded by the following municipalities:
north:  Novo Planalto
east:  Porangatu
west:  São Miguel do Araguaia
south:  Amaralina

The economy
The main economic activities are cattle raising (134,000 head in 2006) and plantations of rice (1,560 tons in 650 hectares planted), sugarcane, manioc (2,400 tons in 150 hectares planted), corn (1800 tons in 600 hectares planted), and soybeans (4,050 tons in 1,500 hectares planted.  In 2006 there were 402 farms with a total area of 198,313 hectares, of which 2,074 hectares were planted.  Farming occupied around 1,200 workers.  Most of the farms were involved in livestock raising.  There were no banks in 2007.

Health and education
There were 4 schools with 1,113 students in 2006.  Bonópolis is one of the poorest municipalities in the state with a Municipal Human Development Index rating of 0.683
State ranking:  222 (out of 242 municipalities)
National ranking:  3255 (out of 5507 municipalities)

See also
List of municipalities in Goiás
Microregions of Goiás

References

Frigoletto

Municipalities in Goiás